Shafi Ullah is a Pakistani politician who had been a member of the Provincial Assembly of Khyber Pakhtunkhwa from August 2018 till January 2023. He was Special Assistant to the Chief Minister on Prisons Khyber Pakhtunkhwa.

Political career

He was elected to the Provincial Assembly of Khyber Pakhtunkhwa as a candidate of Pakistan Tehreek-e-Insaf from Constituency PK-15 (Lower Dir-III) in 2018 Pakistani general election.

References

Living people
Pakistan Tehreek-e-Insaf MPAs (Khyber Pakhtunkhwa)
Year of birth missing (living people)